Ralph Henry Barbour (November 13, 1870 – February 19, 1944) was an American novelist, who primarily wrote popular works of sports fiction for boys. In collaboration with L. H. Bickford, he also wrote as Richard Stillman Powell, notably Phyllis in Bohemia.  Other works included light romances and adventure.

Biography
During his career, Barbour produced more than 100 novels as well as a number of short stories.

Sports
In 1904 book publisher D. Appleton & Co. issued several sports books with editor Ralph Henry Barbour using information from prior Spalding Athletic Library books by special arrangement from American Sports Publishing.

Selected works

As Richard Stillman Powell
 Phyllis in Bohemia, 1897

As Ralph Henry Barbour
 The Story My Doggie Told to Me, unknown year
 The Half-Back, 1899
 For the Honor of the School: A Story of School Life and Interscholastic Sport, 1900
 Captain of the Crew, 1901
 Behind the Line: A Story of College Life and Football, 1902
 Weatherby's Inning, 1903
The Land of Joy, 1903
  The Arrival of Jimpson and Other Stories for Boys About Boys, 1904
 On Your Mark!, 1904
 Kitty of the Roses, 1904
 An Orchard Princess, 1905
 The Crimson Sweater, 1905 
 A Maid in Arcady 1906
 Four Afoot, 1906
 Holly: The Romance of a Southern Girl, 1907
 The Spirit of the School, 1907
 Tom, Dick and Harriet, 1907
 Harry's Island, 1908
 Forward Pass, 1908
 My Lady of the Fog, 1908 
 The Half-Back: A Story of School, Football, and Golf, 1909
 Double Play; A Story of School and Baseball, 1909
 The Lilac Girl, 1909
 Captain Chub, 1910
 Winning His "Y": A Story of School Athletics, 1910
 The Golden Heart, 1910
 Kingsford Quarter, 1910
 The New Boy at Hilltop and Other Stories,  1910
 Finkler's Field: A Story of School and Baseball, 1911
 For Yardley: A Story of Track and Field, 1911
 Joyce of the Jasmines, 1911
 Team-Mates, 1911
 Four in Camp a Story of Summer Adventures in the New Hampshire Woods, 1912
 Four Afloat Being the Adventures of the Big Four on the Water, 1912
 Weatherby's Inning, 1912
 The Harbor of Love, 1912
Change Signals: A Story of the New Football 1912
 Cupid En Route, 1912 (?)
 Crofton Chums, 1912 (?)
 Lady Laughter, 1913
 Around the End, 1913
 Partners Three, 1913
 Left End Edwards, 1914
 Benton's Venture, 1914 (?)
 The Brother of a Hero, 1914
 Heart's Content, 1915
 Left Tackle Thayer, 1915
 The Secret Play, 1915
 The Lucky Seventh, 1915 (?)
 The Purple Pennant, 1916
 Left Guard Gilbert, 1916
 Center Rush Rowland, 1917 (?)
 The Adventure Club Afloat, 1917
 Winning His Game, 1917
 For the Freedom of the Seas,  1918
 The Junior Trophy, 1918
 Full-Back Foster, 1919
 Joan of the Island, 1920 (with H.P. Holt)
 Quarter-Back Bates, 1920
 Fourth Down, 1920
 The Cruise of the Endeavour, or, Fortunes of War, 1921
 Kick Formation, 1921
 Metipom's Hostage, 1921 (?)
 Left Half Harmon, 1921
 Over Two Seas, 1922
 Right End Emerson, 1922 (?)
 The Turner Twins, 1922 (?)
Right Guard Grant 1923
 Right Tackle Todd, 1924
 The Fighting Scrub, 1924
 Spaniard's Cave, 1924
 Right Half Hollins, 1925
 Barry Locke, Half Back, 1925
 Bases Full, 1925
 The Last Play, 1926
 Bud Pringle, Pirate, 1926
 Tod Hale with the Crew, 1926
 Let's Go To Florida!, 1926
 The Long Pass, 1927
 Heading North, 1927
 Tod Hale at Camp, 1927
 Tod Hale at Yale, 1927
 Tod Hale on the Scrub, 1928
 Hunt Holds the Center, 1928
 Comrades of the Key, 1928 (?)
 Substitute Jimmy, 1928
 Giles of the Mayflower", 1929
 Hero of the Camp, 1932 
 The Cub Battery, 1932
 Pirates of the Shoals, 1932
 Skate, Glendale!, 1932
 The Crew of the "Casco", 1933 (?)
 Peril in the Swamp 1934
 Five Points Service, 1935
 Good Manners for Boys, 1937 (?)
 How to Play Better Baseball, 1937 (with Lamar Sarra)
 Hurricane Sands, 1940
 How to Play Better Basketball, 1941 (with Lamar Sarra)
 Mystery on the Bayou'', 1943 (?)

References

Sources
Author and Bookinfo.com

External links

 
 
 
 

1870 births
1944 deaths
20th-century American novelists
20th-century American male writers
American male novelists
American children's writers